Georgia Bonora is an Australian former gymnast who represented Australia at the 2008 Summer Olympics, which took place in Beijing, China, and the 2012 Summer Olympics in London.

Personal
Born in Melbourne on 19 May 1990, Bonora had problems with her ankle in 2011 and 2012.

Artistic gymnastics
Bonora is an all-arounder. She represented Australia in gymnastics at the 2008 Summer Olympics. She did not compete in 2011 because of an ankle injury. As a member of the 2012 Australian senior squad, she was coached by John Hart.

At the 2012 Australian Gymnastics Championships in Sydney, she finished fifth on balance beam and seventh on uneven bars. The event was part of the Australian national team Olympic qualifying process. In mid-June 2012, she was one of twelve Australian gymnasts vying to earn a final spot on the Olympic squad at a training session for the national team at the Australian Institute of Sport. She was selected to represent Australia at the 2012 Summer Olympics in women's artistic gymnastics. She was selected to compete in the women's team event. These were her second Games. Her Olympic training preparations included learning how to deal with flash photography, with strobe lighting used at practice, and being exposed to distracting noises.

References

External links
 
 
 
 
 
 
 Gymnastics Australia Profile
 2006 World Championships Results

1990 births
Living people
Australian female artistic gymnasts
Australian Ninja Warrior contestants
Gymnasts at the 2008 Summer Olympics
Olympic gymnasts of Australia
Commonwealth Games gold medallists for Australia
Gymnasts at the 2010 Commonwealth Games
Australian Institute of Sport gymnasts
Gymnasts at the 2012 Summer Olympics
Commonwealth Games silver medallists for Australia
Commonwealth Games bronze medallists for Australia
Commonwealth Games medallists in gymnastics
21st-century Australian women
Medallists at the 2010 Commonwealth Games